Gary Beals (born October 25, 1982) is a Canadian singer who is best known for being runner up  in the first season of the reality television series Canadian Idol. He is a resident of Cherry Brook, Nova Scotia and named "Best Halifamous Person of 2003" by The Coast. Halifax Regional Municipality celebrated "Gary Beals Day" on November 22, 2003.

Career 
After coming second place to Ryan Malcolm on Canadian Idol, he released a self-titled debut CD in August 2004.

His first album, Gary Beals, entered the Canadian album charts at Number 10 and went on to sell 110,000 copies.

His second album, The Rebirth Of..., was released on June 9, 2009.

His third studio album, Bleed My Truth was released October 23, 2020. His first single from the album, "Me For Me", 'is about being vulnerable and not being afraid to expose pieces of ourselves. It's about having open and honest conversations with those we love.'

Discography

Albums

Singles

"—" denotes releases that did not chart.

References

External links
Gary Beals – Official Website

1982 births
21st-century Black Canadian male singers
Black Nova Scotians
Canadian Idol participants
Canadian contemporary R&B singers
Musicians from Halifax, Nova Scotia
Living people